This is a list of newspapers in New York state. For periodicals specific to New York City, see List of New York City newspapers and magazines.

Daily newspapersThis is a list of daily newspapers currently published in New York. For weekly newspapers, see List of newspapers in New York.
 AM New York – New York City
 The Buffalo News – Buffalo
 The Citizen – Auburn
 Columbia Daily Spectator – New York City
 The Cornell Daily Sun – Ithaca
 The Daily Bugle - New York City

 Daily Freeman – Kingston
 The Daily Gazette – Schenectady
 Daily Messenger – Canandaigua
 The Daily News – Batavia
 The Daily Orange – Syracuse
 The Daily Star – Oneonta
 Democrat and Chronicle – Rochester
 The Epoch Times – New York City
 The Evening Tribune – Hornell
 The Ithaca Journal – Ithaca
 The Journal News – White Plains
 The Leader – Corning
 The Leader-Herald – Gloversville
 Lockport Union-Sun & Journal – Lockport
 New York Daily News – New York City
 New York Law Journal – New York State
 New York Post – New York City
 The New York Times – New York City
 New-York Tribune
 Newsday – Melville
 Niagara Gazette – Niagara Falls
 Observer – Dunkirk
 Observer-Dispatch – Utica
 Olean Times Herald – Olean
 Open Air PM – New York City
 The Post-Journal – Jamestown
 The Post-Standard – Syracuse
 The Post-Star – Glens Falls
 Poughkeepsie Journal – Poughkeepsie
 Press & Sun Bulletin – Binghamton
 Press-Republican – Plattsburgh
 The Record – Troy
 The Register Star – Hudson
 Salamanca Press – Salamanca
 The Saratogian – Saratoga Springs
 Star-Gazette – Elmira
 Staten Island Advance – Staten Island
 Times Herald-Record – Middletown
 The Times Telegram – Herkimer
 Times Union – Albany
 Tonawanda News – North Tonawanda
 The Wall Street Journal – New York City
 Washington Square News – New York City
 Watertown Daily Times – Watertown
 Wellsville Daily Reporter – Wellsville
Weekly and other newspapers
 Akhon Samoy – New York City
 Al-Hoda – New York City
Algemeiner Journal – New York City
 The Altamont Enterprise – Altamont
 Am-Pol Eagle – Buffalo
 Amerikai Magyar Szo – New York City
 Arcade Herald – Arcade
 Armenian Reporter International – New York City
 Der Blatt – Brooklyn
 Bronx Times-Reporter – Bronx
 Brooklyn Eagle – Brooklyn
 The Brooklyn Rail – Brooklyn
 The Chief-Leader – New York City
 The Chronicle (Goshen and Chester) (Tuesdays & Fridays: twice-weekly)
 CityArts – New York City
 Dan's Papers - Eastern Long Island
 El Correo NY - New York City 
 El Diario La Prensa – New York City
 Farmingdale Observer – Nassau County
 Filipino Reporter – New York City
 Garden City Life – Nassau County
 Glen Cove Record Pilot – Nassau County
 Great Neck Record – Nassau County
 Haïti Progrès – Brooklyn
 Hamburg Sun – Hamburg
 Hamodia – Brooklyn
 Hofstra Chronicle – Hempstead
 Irish Voice – New York City
 The Jewish Daily Forward – New York City
 Jewish Post of New York – New York City
 Jewish Press – Brooklyn
 Journal of Commerce – New York City
 Legislative Gazette – Albany
 Levittown Tribune – Nassau County
 Lewiston-Porter Sentinel – Niagara County, New York
 Long Island Business News – Long Island
 Long Island Exchange – Long Island
 Long Island Press – Long Island
 Long Islander News – Huntington
 Manhasset Press – Nassau County
 Massapequa Observer – Nassau County
 Mineola American – Nassau County
 Nassau Herald – Cedarhurst, Lawrence, Inwood, Hewlett, Woodmere
 National Herald (ETHNIKOS KERYX) – New York City
 Noticia - Nassau & Suffolk Counties
 New Hyde Park Illustrated News – Nassau County
 New York Amsterdam News – New York City
 The New York Observer – New York City
 New York Press – New York City
 New York Sun – New York City
 New Yorker Staats-Zeitung – New York City
 North County News – Yorktown
 The North Shore Leader – Locust Valley, North Shore, Long Island
 Norwood News – Bronx
 Nowy Dziennik – New York City
 Outreach – New York City
 Oyster Bay Enterprise-Pilot – Nassau County
 Oyster Bay Guardian 
 People's Weekly World – New York City
 Plainview-Old Bethpage Herald – Nassau County
 The Port Times Record – Port Jefferson, Belle Terre, Port Jefferson Station and Mount Sinai
 Port Washington News – Nassau County
 The Jewish Star
 Queens Chronicle – Queens
 The Riverdale Press – New York City
 The Roslyn News – Nassau County
The Southampton Press — Southampton
The Sag Harbor Express — Sag Harbor
 Super Express USA – New York City
 Syosset-Jericho Tribune – Nassau County
 Tiesa – Middletown
 Times Journal of Cobleskill – Cobleskill
 The Times of Huntington-Northport – Northport, East Northport, Fort Salonga - West, Eaton's Neck, Asharoken, Centerport, Smithtown, Nesconset, Hauppauge, St. James, Nissequogue, Head of the Harbor, The Branch, San Remo, Kings Park, Fort Salonga - East, and Commack
 The Times of Middle Country – Selden, Centereach and Lake Grove
 The Times of Smithtown – Smithtown, Nesconset, Hauppauge, St. James, Nissequogue, Head of the Harbor, The Branch, San Remo, Kings Park, Fort Salonga - East, and Commack
 Vaba Eesti Sona – New York City
 The Village Beacon Record – Miller Place, Sound Beach, Rocky Point, Shoreham and Wading River
 The Village Times Herald – Setauket, East Setauket, Stony Brook, Old Field, South Setauket, Poquott and Strong's Neck
 Village Voice – New York City
 The Villager – New York City
 Wantagh Herald Citizen
 Warwick Advertiser – Warwick, New York
 Warwick Valley Dispatch –  Warwick, New York 
 The Westbury Times – Nassau County
 Yated Ne'eman – Monsey
 Der Yid – Brooklyn

Defunct
Albany
Newspapers published in Albany, New York:

 The Albany centinel. s.w., July 4, 1797–December 30, 1800+
 Albany chronicle. w., September 12, 1796–August 21, 1797.
 Albany chronicle, or, Journal of the times. w., August 28, 1797–April 9, 1798.
 The Albany gazette.w., November 25, 1771–August 3, 1772.
 The Albany gazette. w., s.w., May 28, 1784–December 25, 1800+
 Albany journal, or, The Montgomery, Washington and Columbia intelligencer. s.w., w., January 26, 1788–May 11, 1789.
 The Albany register. w., s.w., October 13, 1788–December 26, 1800+
 The New-York gazetteer, or, Northern intelligencer. w., June 3 (?), 1782–May 1, 1784.
 The Knickerbocker News

Ballston Spa
Newspapers published in Ballston Spa, New York:

 Saratoga register, or, Farmer's journal. w., July 1798(?)–1800(?)

Bath
Newspapers published in Bath, New York:

 The Bath gazette, and Genesee advertiser. w., December 21, 1796–April 12, 1798.

Brooklyn
Newspapers published in Brooklyn, New York:

 The Courier, and Long Island advertiser. w., June 26(?)–July 25, 1799.
 The Courier, and New-York and Long Island advertiser. w., August 1, 1799–June 26, 1800.
 The Long Island courier. w., July 3–December 31, 1800+
 The Brooklyn Evening Star was being published in 1858.

Buffalo
Newspapers published in Buffalo, New York:

 The Buffalo Beast, alternative weekly published in print 2002-2009 and online until 2013.
 The Buffalo Commercial was published 1842-1924.
 The Buffalo Courier-Express was established in 1926 and folded on September 19, 1982.
 The Buffalo Daily Republic was published 1847-1886.
 Timeline of Selected Newspapers Published in Buffalo, 1818 to the present
 BuffaloResearch.com has links to all known online and offline newspapers from Buffalo, NY.

Canisteo
Newspapers published in Canisteo:
 Canisteo Times, ceased in 1950s.

Catskill
Newspapers published in Catskill, New York:

 Catskill Packet. w., August 6, 1792–August 2, 1794

Cazenovia
Newspapers published in Cazenovia, New York
 Cazenovia Republican was being published in 1850.
 Madison County Gazette, also published in 1850, also favored Whig party.

Cooperstown
Newspapers published in Cooperstown, New York:

 The Otsego herald, or, Western advertiser. w., April 3, 1795–December 25, 1800+

Fishkill
Newspapers published in Fishkill, New York:

 The New-York packet, and the American advertiser. w., January 16, 1777–August 28, 1783.

Hudson
Newspapers published in Hudson, New York:

 The Hudson weekly gazette. w., April 7, 1785–December 27, 1791.

Kingston
Newspapers published in Kingston, New York:

 The Farmer's register. w., September 29, 1792–September 21, 1793.
 The New-York journal, and the general advertiser. w., July 7–October 13, 1777.
 Rising sun. w., September 28, 1793–April 28, 1798.
 Ulster County gazette. w., May 5, 1798–December 27, 1800+

Lansingburgh
Newspapers published in Lansingburgh, New York:

 American spy. w., April 8, 1791–February 27, 1798.
 Tiffany's recorder. w., June (?), 1793–December 2, 1794.

Medina
Newspapers published in Medina, New York:

 The Journal-Register – Medina (18212014)

Monroe County
Newspapers published in Monroe County, New York:
 The North Star, Rochester (18471851)

New York
Newspapers published in New York, New York:

 American citizen and general advertiser. d., March 10–December 31, 1800+
 American Minerva; an evening advertiser. d., May 6, 1795–April 30, 1796.
 American Minerva, and the New-York (evening) advertiser. d., March 20, 1794–May 5, 1795. 1800+
 The American Minerva, patroness of peace, commerce, and the liberal arts. d., December 9, 1793–March 18, 1794.
 American Minerva, patroness of peace, commerce, and the liberal arts and the New-York (evening) advertiser. d., March 19, 1794.
 The American price-current. w., May 1–August 7, 1786.
 The Argus & Greenleaf's new daily advertiser. d., May 11–15, 1795.
 The Argus, or, Greenleaf's new daily advertiser. d., May 16, 1795–August 2, 1796.
 Columbian gazette. w., April 6–June 22, 1799.
 Columbian gazetteer. s.w., August 22, 1793–November 13, 1794.
 Commercial Advertiser. d., October 2, 1797–December 31, 1800+
 The Constitutional gazette. s.w., August 2, 1775–August 28, 1776.
 The Daily advertiser. d., October 17, 1787–December 30, 1800+
 The Daily advertiser, political, commercial, and historical. d., September 20–October 21, 1785.
 The Daily advertiser, political, historical, and commercial. d., October 22, 1785–October 16, 1787.
 The Diary. d., February 1, 1796–March 18, 1797.
 Diary and mercantile advertiser. d., March 20, 1797–September 13 (?), 1798.
 The Diary, & universal advertiser. d., May 1795–January 31, 1796.
 The Diary, & universal daily advertiser. d., February (?)–May 1795.
 The Diary, or, Evening register. d., January 1, 1794–February (?), 1795.
 The Diary, or, Loudon's register. d., February 15, 1792–December 31, 1793.
 Forlorn hope. w., March 24–September 13, 1800.
 Gazette Francaise. t.w., March 4, 1796–October 4, 1799.
 Gazette Francaise et Americaine. t.w., July 6, 1795–March 2, 1796.
 Gazette of the United States. s.w., April 15, 1789–October 13, 1790.
 Greenleaf's new daily advertiser. d., August 3, 1796–March 8, 1800.
 Greenleaf's New York journal, & patriotic register. s.w., January 1, 1794–March 8, 1800.
 The Herald; a gazette for the country. s.w., June 4, 1794–September 30, 1797.
 The Impartial gazetteer, and Saturday evening's post. w., May 17–September 13, 1788.
 The Independent gazette, or, The New-York journal revived.w., s.w., December 13, 1783–March 11, 1784.
 The Independent journal, or, The General advertiser. w., s.w., November 17, 1783–December 24, 1788.
 The Independent New-York gazette. w., November 22–December 6, 1783.
 Independent reflector. w., November 30, 1752–November 22, 1753.
 Loudon's New-York packet. s.w., November 11, 1784–May 13 (?), 1785.
 Mercantile advertiser. d., November 1798–December 31, 1800+
 Metro, May 5, 2004-January 6, 2020
 The Minerva, & mercantile evening advertiser. d., May 2, 1796–September 30, 1797.
 The Morning post, and daily advertiser. d., October 6, 1788–January 2, 1792.
 Mott and Hurtin's New-York weekly chronicle. w., January 1–April 16, 1795.
 New-York chronicle. w., s.w., May 8, 1769–January 4, 1770.
 The New-York daily advertiser. d., March 1–September 19, 1785.
 New-York daily gazette.d, December 29, 1788–April 26(?), 1795.
 The New-York evening-post. w., November 26, 1744–December 18, 1752.
 New-York evening post. t.w., November 17, 1794–May 25, 1795.
 The New-York Gazette. w., November 8, 1725–November 19, 1744.
 The New-York gazette. w., August 13, 1759–December 28, 1767.
 The New-York gazette and general advertiser. d., April 27, 1795–December 26, 1800+
 The New-York gazette: and the weekly mercury. w., February 1, 1768–November 10 (?), 1783.
 The New York gazette; and the weekly mercury. w., February 1, 1768–September 27, 1773.
 The New-York gazette, or, The Weekly post-boy. w., January 1, 1753–March 12, 1759.
 The New-York gazette, or, The Weekly post-boy. w., May 6, 1762–October 9, 1766.
 The New-York gazette, or, The Weekly post-boy. w., October 16, 1766–August or September 1773.

 The New-York gazette, revived in the weekly post boy. w., January 19, 1747–December 25, 1752.
 The New-York gazetteer; and, public advertiser. s.w., December 18, 1786–August 16, 1787.
 The New-York gazetteer, and the country journal. w., t.w., s.w., December 3, 1783–August 11, 1786.
 The New-York journal and daily patriotic register. d., November 19, 1787–July 26, 1788.
 The New-York journal, & patriotic register. s.w., May 4, 1790–December 28, 1793.
 The New-York journal, and State gazette. w., Mar 18, 1784–February 10, 1785.
 New-York journal, and weekly register. w., January 18–November 15, 1787.
 The New-York journal, and the general advertiser. w., February 17–June 16, 1785.
 The New-York journal and weekly register. w., July 31, 1788–April 26, 1790.
 The New-York journal, or, General advertiser. w., October 16, 1766–March 12, 1767.
 The New-York journal, or, The General advertiser. w., March 19, 1767–August 29, 1776.
 The New-York journal, or, The Weekly register. w., June 23, 1785–January 11, 1787.
 The New-York mercury. w., August 3(?), 1752–January 25, 1768.
 The New-York mercury, or, General advertiser. w., September 3, 1779–August 15, 1783.
 The New-York morning post. s.w., April 1783–February 1785.
 The New-York morning post, and daily advertiser. d., February 23, 1785–October 5, 1788.
 The New-York packet. s.w., t.w., w., May 16, 1785–January 26, 1792.
 The New York packet. And the American advertiser. w., January 4, 1776–August 29, 1776; November 13, 1783–November 8, 1784.
 The New-York price-current. w., August 14 (?), 1786–(?).
 New-York price-current. w., May 25, 1799–December 27, 1800+
 New-York prices current. w., 1796–June 1797.
 The New-York weekly chronicle. w., April 23–October 1, 1795.

 The New York Weekly Journal. w., November 5, 1733–March 18(?), 1751.
 The New-York weekly museum. w., September 20, 1788–May 7, 1791.
 The New-York weekly post-boy. w., January 3, 1743–January 12, 1747.
 Oram's New-York price-current, and marine register. w., June 10, 1797–May 18, 1799.
 Parker's New-York gazette, or, The Weekly post-boy. w., March 19, 1759–April 29, 1762.
 Porcupine's gazette. January 13, 1800.
 Prisoner of hope. w., s.w., May 3–August 23, 1800.
 Register of the times. w., June 3, 1796–June 27, 1798.
 Rivington's New-York gazette, and universal advertiser. s.w., November 22–December 31, 1783.
 Rivington's New-York gazette, or, The Connecticut, Hudson's River, New-Jersey, and Quebec weekly advertiser. October 4–October 11, 1777.
 Rivington's New-York gazetteer, or, The Connecticut, Hudson's River, New-Jersey, and Quebec weekly advertiser. w., December 16, 1773–November 23, 1775.
 Rivington's New-York gazetteer, or, The Connecticut, New-Jersey, Hudson's-River, and Quebec weekly advertiser. w., April 22–December 9, 1773.
 Rivington's New York loyal gazette. w., October 18–December 6, 1777.
 The Royal American gazette. w., s.w., January 16, 1777–July 31, 1783.
 The Royal gazette. w., s.w., December 13, 1777–November 19, 1783.
 The Spectator. s.w., October 4, 1797–December 31, 1800+
 Temple of reason. w., November 8–December 31, 1800+
 The Time piece. t.w., September 15, 1797–August 30, 1798.
 The Time piece; and literary companion. t.w., March 13–September 13, 1797.
 Weekly museum. w., May 14, 1791–December 27, 1800+
 Weymans New-York gazette. w., February 16–August 6, 1759.
 The Youth's news paper. w., September 30–November 4, 1797.
 Ye Olde Tri-Valley Townsman. w., May 1947–thru the present 2020.

Poughkeepsie
Newspapers published in Poughkeepsie, New York:

 American farmer, and Dutchess County advertiser. w., June 8, 1798–July 22, 1800.
 The Country journal, and the Poughkeepsie advertiser. w., August 11, 1785–September 23, 1788.
 The New-York journal, and the general advertiser. w., May 11, 1778–January 6, 1782.
 The Poughkeepsie journal. w., July 14, 1789–December 30, 1800+

Rochester
Newspapers published in Rochester, New York
 Frederick Douglass's Paper,  later Douglass's Monthly
 The North Star, 1847–1851

Salem
Newspapers published in Salem, New York:

 Northern centinel. w., January 1, 1798–January 21, 1800+
 Washington patrol. w., May 27–November 18, 1795.

Schenectady
Newspapers published in Schenectady, New York:

 Mohawk Mercury, December 15, 1794–March 13, 1798.
 Schenectady Reflector, 1841–1859 (available at NYS Historic Newspapers).

Syracuse
Newspapers published in Syracuse, New York:

Onondaga Gazette. April 2, 1823-1829.
 Syracuse Telegram and Courier. 1856-1905.
Syracuse Telegram. September 22, 1922-November 24, 1925.
Syracuse Herald-Journal. November 24, 1925-September 29, 2001.
 Syracuse New Times. 1969-June 26, 2019.

Troy
Newspapers published in Troy, New York:

 Northern budget. w., May 15, 1798–December 31, 1800+
 The Recorder. w., May 5–December 8, 1795.
 The National Watchman, an anti-slavery newspaper edited by William G. Allen, was published from 1844–1847. No copies are known to exist.

See also
 New York City media
 List of radio stations in New York
 List of television stations in New York
List of African-American newspapers in New York
Adjoining states
 List of newspapers in Connecticut
 List of newspapers in Massachusetts
 List of newspapers in New Jersey
 List of newspapers in Pennsylvania
 List of newspapers in Vermont

References

Further reading

 
 Weiss, Harry B. A Graphic Summary of the Growth of Newspapers in New York and Other States, 1704–1810. New York: New York Public  Library, 1948
 Brigham, Clarence S. "Bibliography of American Newspapers, 1690–1820 Part VII: New York (A–L)." Proceedings of the American Antiquarian Society 27(1): 177–274. 1917
 Brigham, Clarence S. "Bibliography of American Newspapers, 1690–1820 Part IX: New York (M–W). Excepting New York City" Proceedings of the American Antiquarian Society 28(1): 63–133. 1918
 List of newspapers in New York
 Newspapers published in New York